Kingswood is an unincorporated community in Nelson County, Virginia, United States.

Geography 
According to Google Maps, Kingswood, Virginia is located along Highway 29, positioned South of the city Colleen, Virginia and North of the city Amherst, Virginia. The Tye River flows through Kingswood.

References

GNIS reference

Unincorporated communities in Nelson County, Virginia
Unincorporated communities in Virginia